The alpine she-oak slender bluetongue or alpine she-oak skink  (Cyclodomorphus praealtus) is a species of lizard in the family Scincidae. The species is endemic to the Australian Alps.

The Alpine She-Oak Skink is threatened by climate change, trampling by cattle and feral horses.

References

Cyclodomorphus
Skinks of Australia
Reptiles described in 1995